In the context of microbiology, enucleation refers to removing the nucleus of a cell and replacing it with a different nucleus. This is used mainly in cloning but can also be used for creating hybrids of plants or animals.

List of enucleated cells

Humans 
Red blood cell
Platelets

See also
 Cytoplasmic hybrid
 Cell nucleus

References 

__notoc__
Cell biology
Cloning